Martin of Soure or Martin Arias (b. 11th century, Auranca, Portugal; d. 31 January 1146 in Córdoba, Al-Andalus) was a Portuguese captive canon.

Life

Arias was the son of Manuel Aires and Argia. He entered clerical service under the care of Bishop Maurice of Coimbra. Bishop Maurice was the cousin of Martinho's father, who requested he oversee his son's training. 

Martinho lived and trained in the house of the bishop (in Fradelos, Albergaria-a-Velha, Aveiro District). Later in life, Martinho served as the canon of the Cathedral of Coimbra.

As an ordained priest, Martinho led an exemplary life and was admired for his virtue and charity. Around 1124 he moved to the border town of Soure with his brother Mendo. He established an ecclesiastical chapter to restore the church and give spiritual assistance to people who had been attacked by Muslims in 1117. 

In 1144, the Muslim governor of Santarém Abu Zakaria occupied and destroyed Soure, dispersing a large part of the population to Santarém. There, he predicted the conquest of the city by Afonso I of Portugal and was sent to Évora, Seville, and Córdoba, where he was tortured and died in prison by Abu Zakaria's order in 1146.

The monk Salvado de Santa Cruz wrote about the life of Saint Martinho de Soure around 1150.

Bibliography

de NASCIMENTO, Aires A.. Hagiografia de Santa Cruz de Coimbra: vida de D. Telo, vida de D. Teotónio, vida de Martinho de Soure (em português). [S.l.: s.n.]. Página visitada em 12/08/2012.

External links
 Soure O Ltimo Ataque Muulana
 

Portuguese Roman Catholics
1146 deaths
12th-century Portuguese people
Portuguese torture victims
Year of birth unknown